Jean de Villiers (born 24 February 1981) is a South African former professional rugby union player. He started his career at wing, but played most of his career as an inside centre. De Villiers previously played for Western Province in the Currie Cup, the Stormers in Super Rugby, Leicester Tigers in Premiership Rugby and internationally for South Africa, for whom he was named captain in June 2012.

Career
A product of Paarl Gimnasium, the nursery of many a future South African star player (among them past international teammate Marius Joubert and South African back-rower Schalk Burger), De Villiers made his first impact at international level in the South African Sevens team, playing in ten of the eleven legs of the 2001–02 World Sevens Series, helping his country finish in second spot. He was also a member of the squad that finished third in the 2002 Commonwealth Games. Also in 2002, he made his first international impact in the 15-man game at the U-21 Rugby World Cup, scoring four tries in the tournament for the victorious Junior Springboks.

He made his first senior-level appearance for South Africa in November 2002 against France, but suffered a major knee injury five minutes into the game. After regaining fitness, he became an important player in the Boks' 2004 renaissance, which saw them earn an unexpected victory in the Tri Nations Series that year. Both he and his former Paarl teammate Joubert earned a share of the try-scoring lead in the 2004 Tri Nations, with three apiece.

De Villers won the World Cup with South Africa in 2007, although he tore his biceps during the opening game of the tournament and took no further part. In 2009 De Villers won a second Tri Nations with South Africa. In November 2014 while playing against Wales in Cardiff, he suffered a potentially career ending injury that involved dislocating his left knee with tearing of major ligaments, reconstruction with artificial ligaments and rehabilitation allowed him back into the game. After recovering from the injury De Villers captained South Africa during the 2015 Rugby World Cup, but he fractured his jaw during the second match and was ruled out of the tournament.

Move to Munster
On 20 July 2009, it was announced that De Villiers will leave Western Province and join Munster from mid-September 2009 on a one-year contract, with an option to renew for another two years. De Villiers's first game for the province was against Newport-Gwent Dragons in the Magners League on Sunday 27 September at Musgrave Park, when he started alongside Lifeimi Mafi in the Munster midfield as a late call-up after Keith Earls was forced withdraw through illness, De Villiers having initially been named on the bench. Munster won 27–3. He scored his first try for Munster in a Heineken Cup tie with Treviso at Thomond Park in October. Munster won the match 41–10 with De Villiers scoring Munster's seventh and final try of the game. He scored his second try against Ulster in the Magners league and third against Perpignan in the Heineken cup.

He left Munster and returned to South Africa at the end of their season in 2010. In June 2010 he signed a contract to play for Western Province in the 2010 Currie Cup (although he missed most of the tournament due to international duties) as well as for the Stormers in the inaugural Super 15 competition in 2011.

2009 Tri Nations
South Africa won the 2009 Tri-Nations. He started the first game at inside-centre in which South Africa beat New Zealand 28–19. De Villers then played all the other matches scoring one try against New Zealand in which the Boks won 32–29.

2010 Tri Nations
Jean De Villiers started the Tri-Nations playing on the right wing in which New Zealand beat the Boks 32–12. The All Blacks then beat them 31–17 in which de Villiers continued his run as a right-winger. The Boks were then edged by the All Blacks 29–22 in which De Villiers started at inside-centre. South Africa then beat Australia 44-31 but lost 41-39 the next game which De Villiers scored his first try of the 2010 Tri-Nations.

2012 mid-year test series
De Villiers was selected as captain of the Springboks as England toured South Africa in mid-2012. The coach Heyneke Meyer was delighted to announce him as captain after a series of good performances for his team in Super Rugby. On 9 June 2012 the first test was played in Durban; South Africa beat England 22–17 with De Villiers scoring a try in the 59th minute. The next Saturday he led South Africa against England in the second test in Johannesburg which the Boks won 36–27. The third and final test on 23 June 2012 in Port Elizabeth was drawn 14-14.

At the conclusion of the 2012 Rugby Championship, De Villiers joined up with Western Province for the later stages of the Currie Cup. De Villiers was injured in his first match back causing him to miss the semi-final and the final. De Villiers accompanied the team to the final against the Sharks on 27 October 2012 in Durban as the 23rd player. Western Province won the final and De Villiers did receive a winners tankard at the post match presentation.

Initial Retirement
De Villiers announced his retirement from test rugby on 27 September 2015 following a jaw fracture he sustained at the 2015 Rugby World Cup. In response, he exclaimed that "Injuries are part of rugby and I've had my fair share, so by now I know how to cope with them. It's very sad, but life goes on – I need to take it all in and move forward".  head coach Heyneke Meyer paid tribute to De Villiers, saying: "Rugby will be poorer without him [De Villiers]" and adding that "He is a true ambassador for South Africa".

Leicester Tigers
On 27 October 2015, it was announced that De Villiers would join Leicester Tigers from December 2015. His first game was on 19 February 2016 against Harlequins in a 19–25 loss at The Stoop. He scored his first try in the following and De Villiers' final game against London Irish at Welford Road. In April 2016, De Villiers was announced as being set to leave Welford Road at the end of the 2015–16 season. No departure was confirmed at the end of the 2015–16 season, and De Villiers was not announced in the 2016–17 season squad.

Statistics
 Test Debut: Versus France on 9 November 2002
 Total Tests: 109
 Springbok captain: 54th
 Springbok captain tests: 37
 Tries for South Africa: 27
 Tries for Stormers & Western Province: 58
 Total career tries: 94
 Most capped South African centre: 94 tests

Test Match record

Pld = Games Played, W = Games Won, D = Games Drawn, L = Games Lost, Tri = Tries Scored, Pts = Points Scored

Test tries (27)

References

External links 
 Munster profile
 
 
 Jean de Villiers on www.genslin.us/bokke
 

1981 births
Living people
Sportspeople from Paarl
Afrikaner people
South African people of French descent
South African rugby union players
South Africa international rugby union players
Stormers players
Western Province (rugby union) players
Rugby union centres
Rugby union wings
Alumni of Paarl Gimnasium
Barbarian F.C. players
Munster Rugby players
South Africa international rugby sevens players
Male rugby sevens players
South African expatriate rugby union players
South African expatriate sportspeople in Ireland
Expatriate rugby union players in Ireland
Rugby sevens players at the 2002 Commonwealth Games
Commonwealth Games bronze medallists for South Africa
Leicester Tigers players
Commonwealth Games medallists in rugby sevens
Commonwealth Games rugby sevens players of South Africa
Rugby union players from the Western Cape
Medallists at the 2002 Commonwealth Games